Nathaniel Harvey IV (born September 15, 1996) is an American football outside linebacker. He played college football at East Carolina.

College career 
Harvey spent his freshman and sophomore seasons at Georgia Military Junior College and joined East Carolina as a walk-on transfer for his junior and senior seasons.

Harvey played running back for his freshman, sophomore, and junior seasons before switching to defensive end for his senior season.

After recording 14.5 sacks in his senior season, he was named the AAC Defensive Player of the Year.

Harvey was entered the 2019 NFL Draft after being denied a fifth year of eligibility by the NCAA.

Professional career

New York Giants
After going undrafted in the 2019 NFL Draft, Harvey signed with the New York Giants.

Harvey was placed on injured reserve after suffering a knee injury during mini camp. He was waived on April 8, 2020, with a failed physical designation.

Hamilton Tiger-Cats
Harvey signed with the Hamilton Tiger-Cats of the CFL on March 12, 2021. He was released on July 26, 2021.

Personal life 
Harvey is the son of Nathaniel Harvey III and Zelinka Harvey.

References 

1996 births
Living people
People from Knightdale, North Carolina
Players of American football from North Carolina
American football defensive ends
East Carolina Pirates football players
New York Giants players
Hamilton Tiger-Cats players